Through Darkened Vales is a 1911 American short silent drama film directed by D. W. Griffith and starring Blanche Sweet.

Cast
 Blanche Sweet as Grace
 Grace Henderson as Grace's Mother
 Charles West as Dave
 Joseph Graybill as Howard
 Edwin August

See also
 D. W. Griffith filmography
 Blanche Sweet filmography

References

External links

1911 films
American silent short films
Biograph Company films
American black-and-white films
1911 drama films
Films directed by D. W. Griffith
1911 short films
Silent American drama films
Films with screenplays by Stanner E.V. Taylor
1910s American films